Sugar Camp is an unincorporated community in Doddridge County, West Virginia, United States.  The community is located along West Virginia Route 18 at the confluence of Toms Fork and Meathouse Fork.

References 

Unincorporated communities in West Virginia
Unincorporated communities in Doddridge County, West Virginia